Rabbi John Desmond Rayner  (30 May 1924 – 19 September 2005) was a British Liberal Jewish rabbi. He was born in Berlin as Hans Sigismund Rahmer. He left Berlin in 1939 on one of the last Kindertransports. The Kindertransport programme brought around 10,000 children to the UK. Both his parents, Ferdinand Rahmer and Charlotte Landshut, were murdered in the Holocaust.

Between 1943 and 1947 Rayner served in the British Army. In October 1947 he took up an open scholarship in modern languages that he had previously won at Emmanuel College, Cambridge five years earlier. In his second year he switched to Moral Science which comprised philosophy, logic, ethics and psychology and graduated in 1950 with First Class Honours. In his third year Rayner specialised in Hebrew, Aramaic, Syriac and Semitic Epigraphy.  In his sixth year Rayner began working as a research student on a thesis about Maimonides' conception of Revelation.

Rayner was ordained in the Liberal Jewish ministry on 21 June 1953 and served the South London Liberal Synagogue, in Streatham until 1957. He then worked at St John's Wood Liberal Synagogue until in 1963 he left for Cincinnati, Ohio, in the United States. Rayner had been invited to the Hebrew Union College to take up a graduate fellowship. He returned to the UK to serve as Minister at the Liberal Jewish Synagogue in June 1965.

He wrote books on diverse topics including halakha, marriage, ethics, Zionism, theology and Jewish-Christian relations. He also gave a large number of sermons. He was voted one of the best preachers in Britain by Harpers and Queen magazine in 1976. During the late 1960s and 1970s Rayner made several appearances on national television and radio.

Working with American Rabbi Chaim Stern, Rayner was the main liturgist of British Liberal Judaism.   They compiled the Sabbath and Festivals and High Holidays liturgy used by all Liberal Synagogues, Service of the Heart and Gates of Repentance, continuing their editorial partnership to co-edit Siddur Lev Chadash.     He was the teacher of liturgy at Leo Baeck College in London.

He was an active participant in inter-faith work as co-chairman of the London Society of Christians and Jews. As a result of this work in 1993 he was appointed a Commander of the Order of the British Empire.

His thought emphasises the importance of ethics and the need for a more halakhic approach to Progressive Judaism.

On 19 September 2005 he died, at home, after a long illness. A carer was by his side on his last night. Her name was "Comfort".

John Rayner was married and had three children and two grandchildren.

Works 
 The Practices of Liberal Judaism (1958). 
 Service of the Heart (1967)
 Gates of Repentance (1973)
 Guide to Jewish Marriage (1975). 
 Judaism for Today (1978). 
 Siddur Lev Chadash (1995). 
 An Understanding of Judaism (Berghahn Books, December 1997). 
 A Jewish Understanding of the World (Berghahn Books, March 1998). 
 Jewish Religious Law. A Progressive Perspective (Berghahn Books, May 1998). 
 Principles of Jewish Ethics: From a Progressive Point of View (New Jewish initiative for social justice, 1998) 
 Aspects of Liberal Jewish Thought (1999)
 Signposts to the Messianic Age: Sermons and Lectures, Vallentine Mitchell (2006).

References 

 Obituary, The Independent, 22 September 2005
 Obituary. The Guardian, 26 September 2005, and follow-up letter
 Obituary. The Times, 29 September 2005
 Tributes to John Rayner, European Judaism, 39(1), Spring 2006
 Brownfeld, Allan C. Rabbi John D. Rayner 1924–2005, Issues, American Council for Judaism, Winter 2006
 Middleburgh, C. H. "A Final Interview with John D. Rayner", European Judaism, 40(1), Spring 2007, pp. 93–99
 Friedlander, A. H. 'The German Influence on Progressive Judaism in Great Britain", Second Chance:Two Centuries of German-speaking Jews in the United Kingdom, (1991), pp. 425–436
 Goldstein, A. "German, English, American Liturgist", European Judaism, 40(1), Spring 2007

1924 births
2005 deaths
20th-century English theologians
20th-century English male writers
20th-century English rabbis
21st-century English male writers
21st-century English theologians
21st-century English rabbis
Alumni of Emmanuel College, Cambridge
British Army personnel of World War II
British Jewish theologians
British Liberal rabbis
Commanders of the Order of the British Empire
English male non-fiction writers
English sermon writers
British Jewish writers
Kindertransport refugees
Naturalised citizens of the United Kingdom
People educated at Durham School
Rabbis from Berlin
Rabbis from London
Writers from London
German emigrants to the United Kingdom